Vikrant or Vikrān‍ta, a name of Indian origin that means powerful or brave, may refer to:

People
 Vikrant Massey (born 1987), Indian actor
 Vikrant Shetty (born 1983), UAE cricketer
 Vikrant Chaturvedi (born 1970), Indian actor
 Vikrant Bhargava (born 1972), Indian-born British entrepreneur

Aircraft carriers
 , decommissioned in 1997
 , commissioned in 2022

See also